Fred A. Petersen (1808-1885) was an American architect. He was one of the original 13 founders of the American Institute of Architects. He was born in Prussia. He was a political refugee having escaped from imprisonment for his involvement in the German Revolution of 1848. In 1855 he patented the first fireproof hollow brick tile for Cooper Union, a building he designed. He died in Orange, New Jersey.

References

Founder of American Institute of Architects
1808 births
1885 deaths
People from the Kingdom of Prussia
19th-century American architects
German emigrants to the United States